The Velvet Ditch is the second EP by English punk rock duo Slaves, released on 18 July 2019. There will be the last EP to change their former band name to "Slaves" turning into "Soft Play".

Track listing

References

2019 EPs
Soft Play albums